The NunatuKavummiut (also called the people of NunatuKavut, formerly Labrador Metis or Inuit-metis) are a people formally recognized by the federal government as among the Indigenous peoples in Canada. They live in central to southern Labrador, and are of mixed Inuit and European heritage. According to recent censuses completed by Statistics Canada, the vast majority of individuals living in NunatuKavut communities identify as Inuit'Métis' as opposed to 'Inuit'. However, they are unrelated to the Metis people of the Red River Colony of Western Canada.

Nunatuĸavut or NunatuKavut means "Our ancient land" in the traditional Inuttitut dialect of central and southern Labrador.  The region claimed by the NunatuKavut Community Council encompasses southern Labrador, from the Grand River (Newfoundland name: Churchill River), South to Lodge Bay and West to the extent of the official border between Quebec and Labrador. However, their proposed land use area is much more extensive.

Nomenclature
The exact term for NunatuKavut's people is uncertain. Historically, terms such as "half-breeds" or "settlers" were used (the former was also commonly used to refer to the Métis). Terms today include "Métis", "Inuit-Métis" and "Southern Inuit".

History

Arrival in southern Labrador 
The people are claimed to be the sole ancestors of the southern Inuit of Labrador who have continuously occupied and used the region for almost a thousand years, long before the Government of Newfoundland and Labrador made any real foray into the area in the early 20th century.

According to one theory, the Inuit arrived in Labrador in the 15th century from Baffin Island.  Archeological evidence shows they lived as far south as the Sandwich Bay area.

Contact with Europeans 
The Inuit were in conflict with the Basque and French whalers beginning in the mid-1500s.

Treaty of 1765 
Following the defeat of France in the Seven Years' War, Britain laid claim to Labrador.  The British governor of Newfoundland Sir Hugh Palliser signed a treaty with the southern Labrador Inuit in 1765.

Marriage between Europeans and Inuit 
During the 19th century, some European men, settled, took Inuit wives, and permanently assimilated into the local culture.  Although influenced in many ways by prolonged contact with seasonal workers and merchants, the culture and way of life has remained distinctly Inuit.

Distribution

NunatuKavut consists of a region of southern Labrador that encompasses communities from Lodge Bay (located on the Lodge River) to the communities located on the coast of Sandwich Bay (Paradise River and Cartwright). However, there are notable populations of people of mixed European and Inuit descent in other parts of Labrador too. Many Inuit in the southern parts of Nunatsiavut are descended from fur traders that worked in the region. NunatuKavut also has a large diaspora in many other parts of Newfoundland and Labrador such as the communities located along the Strait of Belle Isle and on the island of Newfoundland. Many residents of the Quebec community of St. Augustine (known officially as "Saint-Augustin") are also of Inuit and European descent but are represented by Nunamit.

Organization 
NunatuKavummiut are today represented by the NunatuKavut Community Council which was formed in 2010 from its predecessor the Labrador Métis Nation (formerly Labrador Métis Association). They are members of the Congress of Aboriginal Peoples along with other non-Status Aboriginal groups.

Land claim 
The people of NunatuKavut, claim NunatuKavut as their homeland, and are in process of launching an Aboriginal land claim with the Canadian courts. They are also active in the debates over the Lower Churchill hydroelectric project, and the dam at Muskrat Falls.

See also
Nunavik
Nunavut
Labrador Inuit Pidgin French

Further reading
Canadian Government: NunatuKavut Land Claim Document
NunatuKavut Community Council Inc.
 Labrador Inuit History
 Canadian Encyclopedia; Inuit presence in southern Labrador
 Royal Commission White Paper on Renewing and Strengthening Our Place in Canada

References

 
Indigenous peoples in Newfoundland and Labrador
Labrador
Inuit groups
Métis in Canada